Massachusetts House of Representatives' 13th Bristol district in the United States is one of 160 legislative districts included in the lower house of the Massachusetts General Court. It covers part of the city of New Bedford in Bristol County. Since 1991, Antonio Cabral of the Democratic Party has represented the district.

The current district geographic boundary overlaps with that of the Massachusetts Senate's 2nd Bristol and Plymouth district.

Representatives

 Robert Taylor 
 J. Roger Sisson
 Manuel Raposa 
 Antone S. Aguiar Jr.
 Denis Lawrence 
 Antonio F.D. Cabral, 1991-current

See also
 List of Massachusetts House of Representatives elections
 List of Massachusetts General Courts
 Other Bristol County districts of the Massachusetts House of Representatives: 1st, 2nd, 3rd, 4th, 5th, 6th, 7th, 8th, 9th, 10th, 11th, 12th, 14th
 List of former districts of the Massachusetts House of Representatives

Images

References

External links
 Ballotpedia
  (State House district information based on U.S. Census Bureau's American Community Survey).

House
Government of Bristol County, Massachusetts